Canary creeper may refer to:

Senecio tamoides, a South African vine
Tropaeolum peregrinum, a South American vine